Josef Mocker (22 November 1835 in Cítoliby – 15 November 1899 in Prague) was a Bohemian architect and restorer who worked in a purist Gothic Revival style.

Overview
Mocker was responsible for restoring many Bohemian castles and ancient buildings in Prague. His work aroused much controversy, but also contributed many important landmarks of Prague.

From 1879 to 1881, Mocker participated in a reconstruction of Karolinum, today's seat of the Charles University in Prague.

Work
Here is partial list of his prominent works:

 Reconstruction of the Church of St. Stephen in Prague
 Reconstruction of the Church sv. Jindřich and its belltower in Prague
 Reconstruction of the Church of St. Peter in Poříčí, Prague
 Reconstruction of the Basilica of St. Peter and St. Paul in Vyšehrad, Prague
 Church of St. Ludmila in Vinohrady, Prague
 Church of St. Procopius in Žižkov, Prague
 Completion of St. Vitus Cathedral in Prague Castle
 Restoration of Karlštejn Castle
 Reconstruction of Konopiště castle
 Restoration of Křivoklát Castle
 Restoration of Powder Tower in Prague
 Restoration of the cathedral in Kolín
 Restoration of Old New Synagogue in Josefov, Prague

Gallery

References

1835 births
1899 deaths
People from Louny District
Czech architects
Gothic Revival architects
19th-century Czech architects
Burials at Vyšehrad Cemetery